Badaki (also Romanized as Bādakī and Bādekī; also known as Madavai) is a village in Rudbal Rural District, in the Central District of Marvdasht County, Fars Province, Iran. At the 2006 census, its population was 152, in 33 families.

References 

Populated places in Marvdasht County